The Chameleon's Shadow (2007) is a crime novel by English writer Minette Walters.

External links 
More about The Chameleon's Shadow on Walters' website
Agent's dedicated page

2007 British novels
Novels by Minette Walters
Novels set in London
Macmillan Publishers books